This list shows the IUCN Red List status of the 93 mammal species occurring in Portugal. One of them is critically endangered, three are endangered, eleven are vulnerable, and one is near threatened.
The following tags are used to highlight each species' status as assessed on the respective IUCN Red List published by the International Union for Conservation of Nature:

Order: Rodentia (rodents) 

Rodents make up the largest order of mammals, with over 40% of mammalian species. They have two incisors in the upper and lower jaw which grow continually and must be kept short by gnawing.

Suborder: Sciurognathi
Family: Sciuridae (squirrels)
Subfamily: Sciurinae
Genus: Sciurus
 Red squirrel, S. vulgaris 
Family: Gliridae (dormice)
Subfamily: Leithiinae
Genus: Eliomys
 Garden dormouse, E. quercinus 
Family: Cricetidae (hamsters, voles, lemmings)
Subfamily: Arvicolinae
Genus: Arvicola
Southwestern water vole, A. sapidus 
 European water vole, A. amphibius 
Genus: Microtus
 Cabrera's vole, M. cabrerae 
 Field vole, M. agrestis LC
 Mediterranean pine vole, M. duodecimcostatus LC
 Lusitanian pine vole, M. lusitanicus LC
Family: Muridae (mice and rats)
Subfamily: Murinae
Genus: Apodemus
 Wood mouse, A. sylvaticus LC
Genus: Mus
 House mouse, M. musculus LC
 Algerian mouse, M. spretus LC
Genus: Rattus
 Black rat, R. rattus 
 Brown rat, R. norvegicus LC

Order: Lagomorpha (lagomorphs) 

The lagomorphs comprise two families, Leporidae (hares and rabbits), and Ochotonidae (pikas). Though they can resemble rodents, and were classified as a superfamily in that order until the early 20th century, they have since been considered a separate order. They differ from rodents in a number of physical characteristics, such as having four incisors in the upper jaw rather than two.

Family: Leporidae (rabbits, hares)
Genus: Oryctolagus
 European rabbit, O. cuniculus 
Genus: Lepus
 Granada hare, L. granatensis

Order: Erinaceomorpha (hedgehogs and gymnures) 

The order Erinaceomorpha contains a single family, Erinaceidae, which comprise the hedgehogs and gymnures. The hedgehogs are easily recognised by their spines while gymnures look more like large rats.

Family: Erinaceidae (hedgehogs)
Subfamily: Erinaceinae
Genus: Erinaceus
 West European hedgehog, E. europaeus

Order: Soricomorpha (shrews, moles, and solenodons) 

 
The "shrew-forms" are insectivorous mammals. The shrews and solenodons closely resemble mice while the moles are stout-bodied burrowers.

Family: Soricidae (shrews)
Subfamily: Crocidurinae
Genus: Crocidura
 Greater white-toothed shrew, C. russula 
 Lesser white-toothed shrew, C. suaveolens 
Genus: Suncus
 Etruscan shrew, S. etruscus LC
Subfamily: Soricinae
Tribe: Nectogalini
Genus: Neomys
 Southern water shrew, N. anomalus LC
Tribe: Soricini
Genus: Sorex
 Iberian shrew, S. granarius LC
 Eurasian pygmy shrew, S. minutus LC
Family: Talpidae (moles)
Subfamily: Talpinae
Tribe: Desmanini
Genus: Galemys
 Pyrenean desman, G. pyrenaicus 
Tribe: TalpiniGenus: Talpa Iberian mole, T. occidentalis LC

 Order: Chiroptera (bats) 

The bats' most distinguishing feature is that their forelimbs are developed as wings, making them the only mammals capable of flight. Bat species account for about 20% of all mammals.
Family: Vespertilionidae
Subfamily: Myotinae
Genus: MyotisBechstein's bat, M. bechsteini 
Greater mouse-eared bat, M. myotis 
Daubenton's bat, M. daubentonii  
Geoffroy's bat, M. emarginatus 
Escalera's bat, M. escalerai 
Whiskered bat, M. mystacinus 
Natterer's bat, M. nattereri 
Subfamily: Vespertilioninae
Genus: BarbastellaWestern barbastelle, B. barbastellus 
Genus: Eptesicus Serotine bat, E. serotinus LC
Genus: NyctalusGreater noctule bat, N. lasiopterus 
Lesser noctule, N. leisleri 
Azores noctule, N. azoreum VU
Genus: PipistrellusMadeira pipistrelle, P. maderensis VU
Genus: PlecotusBrown long-eared bat, P. auritus 
Grey long-eared bat, P. austriacus LC
Family: Miniopteridae
Genus: MiniopterusCommon bent-wing bat, M. schreibersii 
Family: Molossidae
Genus: TadaridaEuropean free-tailed bat, T. teniotis 
Family: Rhinolophidae
Subfamily: Rhinolophinae
Genus: RhinolophusMediterranean horseshoe bat, R. euryale 
Greater horseshoe bat, R. ferrumequinum 
Lesser horseshoe bat, R. hipposideros 
Mehely's horseshoe bat, R. mehelyi 

 Order: Cetacea (whales) 

The order Cetacea includes whales, dolphins and porpoises. They are the mammals most fully adapted to aquatic life with a spindle-shaped nearly hairless body, protected by a thick layer of blubber, and forelimbs and tail modified to provide propulsion underwater.

Suborder: Mysticeti
Family: Balaenidae
Genus: Eubalaena North Atlantic right whale, E. glacialis EN
Family: Balaenopteridae
Subfamily: Balaenopterinae
Genus: Balaenoptera Fin whale, B. physalus EN
 Blue whale, B. musculus EN
Suborder: Odontoceti
Superfamily: Platanistoidea
Family: Phocoenidae
Genus: Phocoena Harbour porpoise, P. phocoena VU
Family: Physeteridae
Genus: Physeter Sperm whale, P. macrocephalus VU
Family: Kogiidae
Genus: Kogia Pygmy sperm whale, K. breviceps DD
 Dwarf sperm whale, K. sima LC
Family: Ziphidae
Genus: Ziphius Cuvier's beaked whale, Z. cavirostris DD
Subfamily: Hyperoodontinae
Genus: Hyperoodon Bottlenose whale, H. ampullatus DD
Genus: Mesoplodon Sowerby's beaked whale, M. bidens DD
 Blainville's beaked whale, M. densirostris DD
 True's beaked whale, M. mirus DD
Family: Delphinidae (marine dolphins)
 Genus: Lagenorhynchus White-beaked dolphin, Lagenorhynchus albirostris LC
 Genus: Leucopleurus Atlantic white-sided dolphin, Leucopleurus acutus LC
Genus: Steno Rough-toothed dolphin, S. bredanensis DD
Genus: Tursiops Bottlenose dolphin, T. truncatus DD
Genus: Stenella Striped dolphin, S. coeruleoalba DD
 Atlantic spotted dolphin, S. frontalis DD
Genus: Delphinus Short-beaked common dolphin, D. delphis VU
Genus: Grampus Risso's dolphin, G. griseus DD
Genus: Feresa Pygmy killer whale, F. attenuata DD
Genus: Pseudorca False killer whale, P. crassidens LC
Genus: Orcinus 
 Orca O. orca DD
Genus: Globicephala
 Short-finned pilot whale, G. macrorhynchus LC
 Long-finned pilot whale, G. melas LC

Order: Carnivora (carnivorans) 

There are over 260 species of carnivorans, the majority of which primarily eat meat. They have a characteristic skull shape and dentition. 
Suborder: Feliformia
Family: Felidae (cats)
Subfamily: Felinae
Genus: Felis
 European wildcat, F. silvestris 
Genus: Lynx
 Iberian lynx, L. pardinus  reintroduced
Family: Viverridae
Subfamily: Viverrinae
Genus: Genetta
 Common genet, G. genetta  introduced
Family: Herpestidae
Genus: Herpestes
 Egyptian mongoose, H. ichneumon 
Suborder: Caniformia
Family: Canidae (dogs and foxes)
Genus: Vulpes
 Red fox, V. vulpes 
Genus: Canis
 Gray wolf, C. lupus 
 Iberian wolf, C. l. signatus
Family: Mustelidae (mustelids)
Genus: Lutra
 European otter, L. lutra 
Genus: Martes
 Beech marten, M. foina 
 European pine marten, M. martes 
Genus: Meles
 European badger, M. meles 
Genus: Mustela
 Stoat, M. erminea 
 Least weasel, M. nivalis 
 European polecat, M. putorius 
Genus: Neogale
American mink, N. vison  introduced
Family: Phocidae (earless seals)
Genus: Cystophora
Hooded seal, C. cristata 
Genus: Erignathus
 Bearded seal, Erignathus barbatus LC
Genus: Monachus
 Mediterranean monk seal, M. monachus  Madeira only
Genus: Phoca
 Common seal, P. vitulina LC
Genus: Pusa
 Ringed seal, P. hispida LC

Order: Artiodactyla (even-toed ungulates) 

The even-toed ungulates are ungulates whose weight is borne about equally by the third and fourth toes, rather than mostly or entirely by the third as in perissodactyls. There are about 220 artiodactyl species, including many that are of great economic importance to humans.

Family: Cervidae
Subfamily: Cervinae
Genus: Cervus
Red deer, C. elaphus 
Genus: Dama
 European fallow deer, D. dama LC introduced
Subfamily: Capreolinae
Genus: Capreolus
Roe deer, C. capreolus 
Family: Bovidae
Subfamily: Caprinae
Genus: Capra
 Spanish ibex, C. pyrenaica  reintroduced
 Portuguese ibex, C. p. lusitanica 
 Western Spanish ibex, C. p. victoriae introduced
Family: Suidae
Genus: Sus
Wild boar, S. scrofa

Locally extinct 

The following species are locally extinct in the country:
Brown bear, Ursus arctos
Common noctule, Nyctalus noctula
Eurasian beaver, Castor fiber
Wild horse, Equus ferus

See also
List of chordate orders
List of prehistoric mammals
Lists of mammals by region
Mammal classification
List of mammals described in the 2000s

References

External links

Mammals
Portugal